Testacea may refer to:
 a former order of rhizopods, which consisted of testate amoeboid organisms. 
 a former group of shelled molluscs and other invertebrates, created by Linnaeus and roughly corresponding to the colloquial term seashell (see Vermes).
 a species group of Drosophila in the Drosophila (subgenus).

References

Amoeboids